The WCAT Radio Tower, at , is the tallest man-made structure in Vermont. It is located in Burlington, Vermont. It broadcasts at 5000 Watts. WCAT was the only radio station that had a radio tower within the city limits of Burlington. There is a second  tower, also built in 1981, which is a directional aerial beside the WKDR Radio Tower.

See also
 List of tallest structures in the United States
 WCAT

References

External links
 Structurae page
 Colorful description of the site
 Slider page

Towers in Vermont
Buildings and structures in Burlington, Vermont